Bradford Claude Dourif (born March 18, 1950) is an American actor. He was nominated for an Oscar, and won a Golden Globe and a BAFTA Award for his film debut role as Billy Bibbit in One Flew Over the Cuckoo's Nest (1975). He is also known for portraying Gríma Wormtongue in The Lord of the Rings series (2002–2003) and voicing  Chucky in the Child's Play franchise (1988–present).

Dourif's other film roles include Wise Blood (1979), Ragtime (1981), Dune (1984), Blue Velvet (1986), Mississippi Burning (1988), The Exorcist III (1990), Sworn to Justice (1996) with Cynthia Rothrock, Alien Resurrection (1997), the 2007 remake of Halloween and its sequel. He also appeared in many television series, notably Deadwood (2004–2006, 2019), for which he received Primetime Emmy and Satellite Award nominations for his portrayal of Amos "Doc" Cochran.

Early life 
Dourif was born in Huntington, West Virginia, on March 18, 1950, to Joan Mavis Felton (née Bradford), an actress, and Jean Henri Dourif, an art collector who owned and operated a dye factory.

His paternal grandparents emigrated from France, and his paternal grandfather co-founded the Standard Ultramarine and Color Company in Huntington.  After Dourif's father died in 1953, his mother remarried champion golfer William C. Campbell, who helped raise Dourif and his five siblings (four sisters and one brother). From 1963 to 1965, Dourif attended the private Aiken Preparatory School in Aiken, South Carolina. There, he pursued his interests in art and acting. Although he briefly considered becoming a flower arranger , he was eventually inspired to become an actor by his mother's participation as an actress in a community theater called Give Me Shelter.

After Aiken, he attended Fountain Valley School in Colorado Springs, Colorado, graduating in 1968. Dourif appeared as an amateur at the Fountain Valley Film Festival in 1969, taking second place in the 8 mm film category with his 10-minute entry "Blind Date." Dourif attended Marshall University for a time, before quitting college and moving to New York City to study acting on the advice of actress Conchata Ferrell.

Career

Stage 
Starting in school productions, Dourif progressed to community theater, joining up with the Huntington Community Players while attending Marshall University. In New York City, he studied with Sanford Meisner, and worked with Marshall Mason and Lanford Wilson at the Circle Repertory Company. During the early 1970s, Dourif appeared in a number of plays, off-Broadway and at Woodstock, New York, including The Ghost Sonata, The Doctor in Spite of Himself, and When You Comin' Back, Red Ryder?, in which he was spotted by director Miloš Forman who cast him in One Flew Over the Cuckoo's Nest (1975).

In 2013, after a three-decade absence from the stage, Dourif chose to star alongside Amanda Plummer in the Off-Broadway revival of Tennessee Williams' The Two-Character Play that played to critical acclaim at the New World Stages. He explained, in a filmed interview released by the producers, why he broke his 29-year hiatus from acting in live theater: "I hated the stage, did not want to do it. And then somebody said, 'Will you do a play? It's with Amanda Plummer', and I said, 'Oh shit! No. Oh God, I'm gonna have to do this...'". It opened on June 10, 2013, and closed on September 29, 2013. The play was subject to a number of performance cancellations, one relating to Dourif's absence due to a death in the family. Plummer refused to perform without Dourif, notwithstanding the presence of an understudy.

Film 

Although One Flew Over the Cuckoo's Nest is frequently cited as Dourif's film debut, his first acting for screen was in a low-budget film called Split, which was never released. He followed this with a role in the film W.W. and the Dixie Dancekings (1975), but his bit part was omitted from the final cut of the film. His portrayal of the vulnerable Billy Bibbit in Cuckoo's Nest ended up being his big break, earning him a Golden Globe Award (Best Actor Debut) and a British Academy Award (Supporting Actor) as well as a nomination for Academy Award for Best Supporting Actor.

In 1981, Vincent Canby listed Dourif as one of twelve actors to watch, calling Dourif "one of the most intense, most interesting young film actors of his generation." Dourif returned to New York, where he continued in theater and taught acting and directing classes at Columbia University until 1988 (Don Mancini and Yves Lavandier were among his students), when he moved to Hollywood.

Dourif has often played eccentric or disturbed characters, starting with Cuckoo's Nest and continuing with Eyes of Laura Mars (1978), John Huston's Wise Blood (1979), Forman's Ragtime (1981), Marc Didden's Istanbul (1985) and David Lynch's Dune (1984) and Blue Velvet (1986).

Dourif has appeared in a number of horror films, most notably as the voice of Chucky in the Child's Play franchise. He portrayed the Gemini Killer in The Exorcist III (1990) and appeared in Death Machine (1994), Sworn to Justice with Cynthia Rothrock and Alien Resurrection (1997). He later appeared as Sheriff Lee Brackett in Rob Zombie's Halloween (2007) and Halloween II (2009). In 2013, Dourif reprised his role as Chucky in the sixth installment of the Child's Play franchise, Curse of Chucky, and then again in the 2017 sequel, Cult of Chucky. His daughter, Fiona Dourif, also starred with him in both films.

Other notable film roles include Gríma Wormtongue in the Lord of the Rings trilogy and supporting roles in Fatal Beauty (1987), Mississippi Burning (1988), Hidden Agenda (1990), London Kills Me (1991) and Sinner (2007).

Dourif has worked with director Werner Herzog on many occasions, appearing in Scream of Stone (1991), The Wild Blue Yonder (2005), Bad Lieutenant: Port of Call New Orleans (2009), and My Son, My Son, What Have Ye Done? (2009).

Television 
In 1984, Dourif played a suspected serial killer in the episode "Number Eight" of Tales of the Unexpected. In 1994, he appeared in The X-Files episode "Beyond the Sea" as the psychic serial killer Luther Lee Boggs. He also portrayed Lon Suder in a three episode story arc on Star Trek: Voyager and guest starred as a troubled monk haunted by visions in Babylon 5. Dourif later gained acclaim as Doc Cochran in Deadwood, receiving a 2004 Emmy Award nomination for Outstanding Supporting Actor in a Drama Series.

In 2011, he guest-starred in the third-season finale of Fringe and, in 2014, appeared in the Agents of S.H.I.E.L.D. episode "The End of the Beginning".

In 2021, Dourif reprised his role as Chucky in the television series adaption of the Child's Play franchise titled Chucky.

Music 
In 2012, Dourif contributed spoken word vocals to three songs on the album Misery Together by the Norwegian duo Thinguma*jigSaw. Dourif also appears in the music videos for "Stranger in Town" (1984) by Toto and "Drinking from the Bottle" (2012) by Calvin Harris.

Personal life 
Dourif has been married twice first to Janet Stephanie with whom he had daughter Kristina/Christina Dourif, born c. 1976, and then to the late Jonina Dourif, with whom he had another daughter, actress Fiona Dourif, born 1981.

Filmography

Film

Television

Video games

Awards and honours

References

External links 

 
 
 
 

1950 births
20th-century American male actors
21st-century American male actors
American male film actors
American male television actors
American male video game actors
American male voice actors
American people of French descent
Best Supporting Actor BAFTA Award winners
Living people
Male actors from Colorado Springs, Colorado
Male actors from West Virginia
New Star of the Year (Actor) Golden Globe winners
Actors from Huntington, West Virginia
Marshall University alumni